A Heidelberg Romance is a 1951 West German romance film directed by Paul Verhoeven and starring Liselotte Pulver, O.W. Fischer and Gardy Granass. While accompanying his daughter on a trip to Heidelberg, a wealthy American businessman recounts a romance he had with a local girl forty years before. The film set a template for portraying German-American relations.

The film's sets were designed by the art directors Paul Markwitz and Fritz Maurischat. It was shot at the Bendestorf Studios and on location in Heidelberg.

Cast
Liselotte Pulver as Susanne Edwards
O.W. Fischer as Hans-Joachim, Prinz von Reiningen
Gardy Granass as Fannerl Brückner
Gunnar Möller as William Edwards jr
Hans Leibelt as William Edwards
Ruth Niehaus as Gabriele Attendorf
Hans Reiser as Erwin Turner
Margarete Haagen as Tante Amalie Brückner
Paul Verhoeven as Detektiv Schulze
Melanie Horeschowsky as Alte Fannerl
Joachim Brennecke as Thomas Altendorf
Franz Schafheitlin as Hotelbediensteter

References

Bibliography
Bergfelder, Tim & Bock, Hans-Michael. The Concise Cinegraph: Encyclopedia of German. Berghahn Books, 2009.
Stephan, Alexander. Americanization & Anti-Americanism: The German Encounter With American Culture After 1945. Berghahn Books, 2005.

External links

1951 films
West German films
1950s romance films
German romance films
1950s German-language films
Films directed by Paul Verhoeven (Germany)
Films set in Heidelberg
Films set in the 1910s
1950s German films